The Communist Party of Bohemia and Moravia (KSČM) held a leadership election on 17 May 2008. Zhe incumbent leader Vojtěch Filip was reelected.

Filip's rivals were MP Stanislav Grospič, MEP Miloslav Ransdorf and MP Soňa Marková. Grospič was the strongest rival of Filip. Ransdorf didn't take his poor result well. He stated that KSČM is like "Trabant - it will serve but won't excite.

Result

References

Communist Party of Bohemia and Moravia leadership elections
Communist Party of Bohemia and Moravia leadership election
Indirect elections
Communist Party of Bohemia and Moravia leadership election
Communist Party of Bohemia and Moravia leadership election